Yann Djim Ngarlendana is a Chadian professional football manager.

Career
In 2003, 2005 and 2006 he coached the Chad national football team.

References

External links

Year of birth missing (living people)
Living people
Chadian football managers
Chad national football team managers
Place of birth missing (living people)